Melvin C. Triplett (December 24, 1930 – July 26, 2002) was an American football running back in the National Football League who played for eight seasons for the New York Giants and Minnesota Vikings. He played high school football at Girard High School in Girard, Ohio. He graduated from Girard in 1951 and was inducted into the Girard Hall of Fame in 1997. He played college football at the University of Toledo and was drafted by the Giants in the 1955 NFL Draft, where he played for six seasons.  He scored the opening touchdown against the Chicago Bears in the 1956 championship game, won by the Giants 47–7. He was named New York's outstanding offensive player in the game. He left the Giants for the Minnesota Vikings, where he played in 1961 and 1962. Including both teams, he totaled 2,857 yards and 14 touchdowns in his NFL career.

Among the fans of Mel Triplett during his days on the New York Giants was a young basketball player in New York named Lew Alcindor, later Kareem Abdul-Jabbar.  Abdul-Jabbar says in his 1983 memoir Giant Steps that it was largely Triplett's wearing of uniform No. 33 that made Abdul-Jabbar adopt No. 33 as well, a number he made famous.

References

1930 births
2002 deaths
American football running backs
People from Indianola, Mississippi
People from Girard, Ohio
African-American players of American football
New York Giants players
Minnesota Vikings players
Toledo Rockets football players
Players of American football from Youngstown, Ohio
Players of American football from Mississippi
20th-century African-American sportspeople
21st-century African-American people